Antônio de Sampaio was a Brazilian Brigadier General and war hero, considered to be one of the finest generals during the 19th century. He participated in many rebellions and wars during his service but died from three wounds during the Battle of Tuyutí of the Paraguayan War. He was given the title of Patrono da Arma de Infantaria for his service within the Brazilian infantry.

Early Military Career and Descendants
Antônio was born on "Fazenda Vitor" in Tamboril, 288 kilometers from Fortaleza. He was the son of Antônio Ferreira de Sampaio, who was a blacksmith and Antônia Xavier de Araújo. He had a normal youth like any young man from the countryside at the harshness of the northeastern backlands. At the age of 20, on July 17, 1830, he enlisted as a volunteer in the ranks of the then 22nd Battalion of Hunters, based in the Fortress of Nossa Senhora de Assunção, commissioned as an Ensign on May 20, 1839 and being confirmed on September 2, 1839 and a Lieutenant on December 2, 1839. He then participated in the Cabanagem and Balaiada revolts, as well as the Ragamuffin War. After being promoted to Captain on September 8, 1843, he participated in the Praieira revolt. He was then promoted to Major on July 29, 1852 after serving in the Battle of Caseros of the Platine War and promoted to Lieutenant Colonel on December 2, 1855.

He was then given command of the Police Corps of the Court of Rio de Janeiro and was promoted to Colonel on December 2, 1861 and to Brigadier General on February 18, 1865. His son, Olegário Antônio de Sampaio, was an infantry brigadier general in the Brazilian Army and played a prominent role in the repression of the Revolta da Armada and the War of Canudos. His grandson, Antônio Paiva de Sampaio, also pursued a military career, having distinguished roles in various conflicts in the first half of the 20th century, such as the Paulista Revolt of 1924 and the Constitutionalist Revolution. Some descendants still reside in their hometown.

Paraguayan War
At the head of the Imperial Army's 3rd Division, nicknamed the Encouraçada Division, composed of the legendary Arranca-Toco, Vanguardeiro and Treme-Terra battalions, he fought in the transposition operations of the Paraná River in the Battle of Confluência and in the Battle of Estero Bellaco. At the Battle of Tuyutí, considered the largest battle ever fought in South America, Sampaio was mortally wounded three times by grenade shrapnel in the right thigh and two in the back.

Evacuated from the battlefield, he died aboard the steamer Eponina while it was en-route to Buenos Aires. He was initially buried there on July 8, 1866 but his remains were repatriated in 1869 to Rio de Janeiro, being reburied in the Church of Bom Jesus da Coluna, in the Asilo dos Inválidos da Pátria, where they remained until November 14, 1871 when they were transferred again to his home state, Ceará. Until October 25, 1873, his remains were deposited in the present Cathedral of Fortaleza, being buried in the "São João Batista Cemetery" at Fortaleza. On May 24, 1966, during the Centenary of his death and the Battle of Tuyutí, his remains were removed to a mausoleum on Avenida Bezerra de Menezes in Fortaleza where they remained until May 24, 1996, when he was permanently buried in the Brigadeiro Sampaio Pantheon, erected in front of the Nossa Senhora da Assunção Fortress, headquarters of the 10th Military Region.

Legacy
In 1900, a statue was erected at Praça Castro Carreira in Fortaleza, Ceará. In 1928, the students of the Aspiring Class of the Military School of Realengo, inspired by First Lieutenant Humberto de Alencar Castelo Branco, acclaimed him Patron of the Infantry of the Infantry Battalion of the aforementioned School. In 1940, the 1st Infantry Regiment, heir to the traditions of the Terço Velho de Mem de Sá, was nicknamed the "Sampaio Regiment". He was then given the title of Patrono da Arma de Infantaria of the Brazilian Army in 1962. A group formed in 1981 at the Army Cadet Preparatory School was named the "Brigadeiro Sampaio Class". In 1996, the Brigadeiro Sampaio Pantheon was opened in Fortaleza in front of the Fortress of Nossa Senhora da Assunção , with the transfer of his remains to the site. The statue erected on May 24, 1900 was incorporated into the Pantheon, symbolically returning Sampaio to the barracks in which he had enlisted on July 17, 1830. By Law 11, No. 932 of April 24 , 2009, his name was inscribed in the Steel Book of the Panteão da Pátria e da Liberdade Tancredo Neves, officially receiving the status of a National Hero. On June 10, 2011, the Academia Sulbrasileira de Medalhística (now the Academia Brasileira de Medalhística Civico Militar do Brasil creates the Brigadeiro Sampaio Medal. During the bicentennial of his birth, he was honored by the Brazilian Army by christening all the graduating classes, including the class of students who graduated from the Escola Preparatória de Cadetes do Exército in 2010 were known under the name Turma Bicentenário do Brigadeiro Sampaio. This class provided the EB with the aspiring officers graduated from the Academia Militar das Agulhas Negras in 2014.

References

Bibliography

1810 births
1866 deaths
People from Fortaleza
Brazilian generals
Brigadier generals
19th-century Brazilian military personnel
Brazilian military personnel of the Paraguayan War
Brazilian military personnel killed in action